Hindsight is a 2008 American thriller film produced by Ambush Entertainment. It stars Leonor Varela, Jeffrey Donovan, Waylon Payne, Miranda Bailey, Richard Riehle, Deborah Offner and Arnell Powell and is directed by Paul Holahan.

Plot
Young and broke couple Dina (Miranda Bailey) and Ron (Waylon Payne) put their unborn baby up for adoption online. They get a response from a wealthy married couple, Paul (Jeffrey Donovan) and Maria (Leonor Varela), who are willing to pay up front for the adoption. Dina and Ron arrive at their home and are welcomed in. But, Ron and Dina have a plan in their mind. They are to take their money to buy a new home and not give them the baby. However, Maria and Paul fight back.

External links

2008 films
2008 directorial debut films
2008 thriller films
American thriller films
2000s English-language films
2000s American films